Braswell D. Deen Jr. (August 16, 1925 - December 24, 2020) is an American former politician and judge. He served in the Georgia House of Representatives from 1951 to 1960, and as judge on the Georgia Court of Appeals from 1965 to 1990. He is the son of former Georgia congressman Braswell Deen.

References

2020 deaths
1925 births
Georgia (U.S. state) state court judges
Democratic Party members of the Georgia House of Representatives
People from McRae, Georgia